Jamune Bhanjyang  is a village development committee in Tanahu District in the Gandaki Zone of central Nepal. At the time of the 1991 Nepal census it had a population of 8326 people living in 1570 individual households.

Jamune Village Development Committee is mostly known for oranges. Many people are involved in orange farming.

References

External links
UN map of the municipalities of Tanahu District

Populated places in Tanahun District